Isatis tinctoria, also called woad, dyer's woad, or glastum, is a flowering plant in the family Brassicaceae (the mustard family) with a documented history of use as a blue dye and medicinal plant. Its genus name, Isatis, derives from the ancient Greek word for the plant, ἰσάτις. It is occasionally known as Asp of Jerusalem. Woad is also the name of a blue dye produced from the leaves of the plant. Woad is native to the steppe and desert zones of the Caucasus, Central Asia to Eastern Siberia and Western Asia but is now also found in South-Eastern and Central Europe and western North America.

Since ancient times, woad was an important source of blue dye and was cultivated throughout Europe, especially in Western and Southern Europe. In medieval times, there were important woad-growing regions in England, Germany and France. Towns such as Toulouse became prosperous from the woad trade. Woad was eventually replaced by the more colourfast Indigofera tinctoria and, in the early 20th century, both woad and Indigofera tinctoria were replaced by synthetic blue dyes. Woad has been used medicinally for centuries. The double use of woad is seen in its name: the term "Isatis" is linked to its ancient use to treat wounds; the term "tinctoria" references its use as a dye. There has also been some revival of the use of woad for craft purposes.

History of woad cultivation

Ancient use

The first archaeological finds of woad seeds date to the Neolithic period. The seeds have been found in the cave of l'Audoste, Bouches-du-Rhône, France. Impressions of seeds of Färberwaid (Isatis tinctoria L.) or German indigo, of the plant family Brassicaceae, have been found on pottery in the Iron Age settlement of Heuneburg, Germany. Seed and pod fragments have also been found in an Iron Age pit at Dragonby, North Lincolnshire, United Kingdom. The Hallstatt burials of the Hochdorf Chieftain's Grave and Hohmichele contained textiles dyed with woad.

Melo and Rondão write that woad was known "as far back as the time of the ancient Egyptians, who used it to dye the cloth wrappings applied for the mummies." Skelton informs us that one of the early dyes discovered by the ancient Egyptians was "blue woad (Isatis tinctoria)." Lucas writes, "What has been assumed to have been Indian Indigo on ancient Egyptian fabrics may have been woad." Hall states that the ancient Egyptians created their blue dye "by using indigotin, otherwise known as woad."

The connection seems to be that both glass and the woad are "water-like" ( is from Proto-Indo-European  ). In terms of usage, Latin  is more often used to refer to glass rather than woad. The use of the word for the woad might also be understood as "coloured like glass", applied to the plant and the dye made from it.

Gillian Carr conducted experiments using indigo pigment derived from woad mixed with different binders to make body paint. The resulting paints yielded colours from "grey-blue, through intense midnight blue, to black". People with modern experiences with woad as a tattoo pigment have claimed that it does not work well, and is actually caustic and causes scarring when put into the skin.

It has also been claimed that Caesar was referring to some form of copper- or iron-based pigment. Analysis done on the Lindow Man did return evidence of copper. The same study also noted that the earliest definite reference to the woad plant in the British Isles dates to a seed impression on an Anglo-Saxon pot. The authors theorize that vitrum could have actually referred to copper(II) sulfate's naturally occurring variant chalcanthite or to the mineral azurite. A later study concluded the amount was "not of sufficient magnitude to provide convincing evidence that the copper was deliberately applied as paint".

Woad was an important dyeing agent in much of Europe and parts of England during the medieval period. However, dye traders began to import indigo during the sixteenth and seventeenth centuries, which threatened to replace locally grown woad as the primary blue dye. The translation of vitrum as woad may date to this period.

Medieval period onwards

Woad was one of the three staples of the European dyeing industry, along with weld (yellow) and madder (red). Chaucer mentions their use by the dyer ("litestere") in his poem The Former Age:

No mader, welde, or wood no litestere
Ne knew; the flees was of his former hewe;

The three colours can be seen together in tapestries such as The Hunt of the Unicorn (1495–1505), though typically it is the dark blue of the woad that has lasted best. Medieval uses of the dye were not limited to textiles. For example, the illustrator of the Lindisfarne Gospels used a woad-based pigment for blue paint.

In Viking Age levels at archaeological digs at York, a dye shop with remains of both woad and madder have been excavated and dated to the 10th century. In medieval times, centres of woad cultivation lay in Lincolnshire and Somerset in England, Jülich and the Erfurt area in Thuringia in Germany, Piedmont and Tuscany in Italy, and Gascogne, Normandy, the Somme Basin (from Amiens to Saint-Quentin), Brittany and, above all, Languedoc in France. This last region, in the triangle created by Toulouse, Albi and Carcassonne, known as the Lauragais, was for a long time the biggest producer of woad, or pastel, as it was locally known. One writer commented that "woad […] hath made that country the happiest and richest in Europe."

The prosperous woad merchants of Toulouse displayed their affluence in splendid mansions, many of which still stand, as the Hôtel de Bernuy and the Hôtel d'Assézat. One merchant, Jean de Bernuy, a Spanish Jew who had fled the inquisition, was credit-worthy enough to be the main guarantor of the ransomed King Francis I after his capture at the Battle of Pavia by Charles V of Spain. Much of the woad produced here was used for the cloth industry in southern France, but it was also exported via Bayonne, Narbonne and Bordeaux to Flanders, the Low Countries, Italy, and above all Britain and Spain.

After cropping the woad eddish could be let out for grazing sheep.
The woad produced in Lincolnshire and Cambridgeshire in the 19th century was shipped out from the Port of Wisbech, Spalding and Boston, both the last to northern mills and the USA. The last portable woad mill was at Parson Drove, Cambridgeshire, Wisbech & Fenland Museum has a woad mill model, photos and other items used in woad production.
A major market for woad was at Görlitz in Lausitz. The citizens of the five Thuringian Färberwaid (dye woad) towns of Erfurt, Gotha, Tennstedt, Arnstadt and Langensalza had their own charters. In Erfurt, the woad-traders gave the funds to found the University of Erfurt. Traditional fabric is still printed with woad in Thuringia, Saxony and Lusatia today: it is known as Blaudruck (literally, "blue print(ing)").

Use as Chinese medicine

The woad plant's roots are used in Traditional Chinese medicine to make a medicine known as banlangen that purports to have antiviral properties. Banlangen is used as an herbal medicinal tea in China for colds and tonsular ailments. Used as a tea, it has a brownish appearance and (unlike most Chinese medicines) is mildly sweet in taste.

Woad and indigo

The dye chemical extracted from woad is indigo, the same dye extracted from "true indigo", Indigofera tinctoria, but in a lower concentration.  Following the Portuguese discovery of the sea route to India by the navigator Vasco da Gama in 1498, great amounts of indigo were imported from Asia. Laws were passed in some parts of Europe to protect the woad industry from the competition of the indigo trade. It was proclaimed that indigo caused yarns to rot: "In 1577 the German government officially prohibited the use of indigo, denouncing it as that pernicious, deceitful and corrosive substance, the Devil's dye." This prohibition was repeated in 1594 and again in 1603. In France, Henry IV, in an edict of 1609, forbade under pain of death the use of "the false and pernicious Indian drug".

With the development of a chemical process to synthesize the pigment, both the woad and natural indigo industries collapsed in the first years of the 20th century. The last commercial harvest of woad until recent times occurred in 1932, in Lincolnshire, Britain. Small amounts of woad are now grown in the UK and France to supply craft dyers. The classic book about woad is The Woad Plant and its Dye by J. B. Hurry, Oxford University Press of 1930, which contains an extensive bibliography.

A method for producing blue dye from woad is described in The History of Woad and the Medieval Woad Vat (1998) . In France, woad was treated with human urine, by a profession known as pisseurs, who would drink large quantities of beer to provide a sufficient supply. 

Woad is biodegradable and safe in the environment. In Germany, there have been attempts to use it to protect wood against decay without applying dangerous chemicals. Production of woad is increasing in the UK for use in inks, particularly for inkjet printers, and dyes. The plant can cause problems, however: Isatis tinctoria is classified as an invasive species in parts of the United States.

Invasive and noxious weed
In certain locations, the plant is classified as a non-native and invasive weed. It is listed as a noxious weed by the agriculture departments of several states in the western United States: Arizona, California, Colorado, Idaho, Montana, Nevada, New Mexico, Oregon, Utah, Washington, and Wyoming. In Montana, it has been the target of an extensive, and largely successful, eradication attempt.

Notes

References

Sources

External links

 Woad.org.uk - All About Woad - Cultivation, Extraction, Dyeing with Woad, History and facts about woad
 The Former Woad Industry Rex Wailes in Transactions of the Newcomen Society, 1935-36 Vol 16.
 USDA information on Isatis tinctoria

Brassicaceae
Flora of Western Asia
Flora of Siberia
Medicinal plants of Asia
Plant dyes
Medicinal plants of Europe
Plants used in traditional Chinese medicine
Plants described in 1753
Taxa named by Carl Linnaeus